The following is a list of butterflies of Nepal. Six hundred and seventy-six species and thirty subspecies are listed.

This list is primarily based on Colin Smith's 2006 Illustrated Checklist of Nepal's Butterflies, with some recent additions and a modernized classification. Scientific and common names are also from that book (though corrections have been made when clear). The 27 endemic species or subspecies are marked.

Family Hesperiidae - skippers

Subfamily Coeliadinae
Badamia exclamationis - brown awl
Bibasis sena - orange-tail awl
Burara anadi anadi - plain orange awlet
Burara oedipodea belesis - branded orange awlet
Burara jaina jaina - orange awl
Burara harisa harisa - orange awlet
Burara vasutana - green awlet
Burara amara - small green awlet
Burara gomata - pale green awlet
Hasora anura - slate awl
Hasora chromus chromus - common banded awl
Hasora badra badra - common awl
Choaspes benjaminii japonica - Japanese awlking
Choaspes xanthopogon - Indian awlking
Choaspes furcata - hooked awlking

Subfamily Pyrginae

Tribe Calaenorrhini

Capila lidderdali - Lidderdale's dawnfly
Capila penicillatum - fringed dawnfly
Capila jayadeva - striped dawnfly
Lobocla liliana - marbled flat
Celaenorrhinus ratna tytleri - Tytler's multispotted flat
Celaenorrhinus pero lucifera - Mussoorie spotted flat
Celaenorrhinus patula - large spotted flat
Celaenorrhinus leucocera - common spotted flat
Celaenorrhinus putra putra - Bengal spotted flat
Celaenorrhinus munda - Himalayan spotted flat
Celaenorrhinus maculicornis - Elwes' spotted flat
Celaenorrhinus dhanada dhanada - Himalayan yellow-banded flat
Celaenorrhinus nigricans nigricans - Himalayan small-banded flat 
Dharpa hanria - hairy angle
Pseudocoladenia fatih - west Himalayan pied flat
Coladenia indrani indrani - tricolour pied flat
Coladenia agnioides - Elwes' pied flat
Sarangesa purendra purendra - spotted small flat
Sarangesa dasahara dasahara - common small flat
Satarupa zulla zulla - Tytler's white flat
Satarupa gopala - large white flat
Seseria dohertyi dohertyi - Himalayan white flat
Chamunda chamunda - olive flat
Gerosis phisara phisara - dusky yellow-breasted flat
Gerosis bhagava bhagava - common yellow-breasted flat
Tagiades japetus ravi - common snow flat 
Tagiades gana athos - suffused snow flat
Tagiades parra gala - large snow flat
Tagiades litigiosa litigiosa - water snow flat
Tagiades menaka menaka - spotted snow flat
Tagiades cohaerens cyntyia - Evans' snow flat
Mooreana trichoneura pralaya - yellow flat
Ctenoptilum vasava vasava - tawny angle
Odontoptilum angulata angulata - chestnut angle
Caprona agama agama - spotted angle
Caprona alida yerburi - Yerbury's golden angle

Tribe Pyrgini
Spialia galba - Indian skipper
Pyrgus nepalensis - Nepal skipper (endemic)

Subfamily Hesperiinae

Tribe Heteropterini

Carterocephalus avanti avanti - orange and silver mountain hopper

Tribe Astictopterini

Astictopterus jama olivascens - forest hopper
Arnetta atkinsoni - Atkinson's bob
Ochus subvittatus subradiatus - tiger hopper
Baracus vittatus septentrionym - hedge hopper
Ampittia dioscorides - bush hopper
Aeromachus kali - blue-spotted scrub hopper
Aeromachus stigmatus stigmatus - veined scrub hopper
Aeromachus jhora jhora - grey scrub hopper
Aeromachus dubius dubius - dingy scrub hopper
Aeromachus pygmaeus - pygmy scrub hopper
Pedesta masuriensis masuriensis - Mussoorie bush bob
Pedesta pandita - brown bush bob
Sebastronyma dolopia - tufted ace
Sovia grahami - Graham's ace
Sovia lucasii separata - Lucas' ace
Thoressa gupta gupta - olive ace
Thoressa aina aina - Garwal ace
Halpe arcuata - overlapped ace 
Halpe zema zema - banded ace 
Halpe kumara - plain ace
Halpe porus - Moore's ace
Halpe homolea molta - Indian ace
Halpe filda - Elwes' ace
Pithauria stramineipennis  - light straw ace
Pithauria murdava - dark straw ace

Tribe Ancistroidini

Iambrix salsala salsala - chestnut bob
Koruthaialos rubecula cachara - narrow banded velvet bob
Koruthaialos butleri - dark velvet bob
Ancistroides nigrita diocles - chocolate demon
Notocrypta curvifascia curvifascia - restricted demon
Notocrypta feisthamelii alysos - spotted demon
Udaspes folus - grass demon

Tribe Plastingiini

Scobura cephala - forest bob
Suada swerga swerga - grass bob
Suastus gremius gremius - Indian palm bob
Cupitha purreea - wax dart
Zographetus satwa - purple and gold flitter
Zographetus ogygia - purple-spotted flitter
Hyarotis adrastus praba - tree flitter
Gangara thyrsis - giant red-eye
Erionota torus - Sikkim palm red-eye
Erionota thrax thrax - common palm red-eye
Matapa aria - common red-eye
Matapa druna - grey-brand red-eye
Matapa sasivarna - black-veined red-eye
Matapa cresta - fringed red-eye
Matapa purpurascens - purple red-eye

Tribe Hesperiini

Ochlodes brahma - Himalayan darter

Tribe Taractrocerini

Taractrocera danna - Himalayan grass dart
Taractrocera maevius sagra - common grass dart
Oriens goloides - Ceylon dartlet
Oriens gola pseudolus - common dartlet
Potanthus pallida - pale dart
Potanthus trachala - broad bident dart
Potanthus pseudomaesa clio - Indian dart
Potanthus dara - Himalayan dart
Potanthus confucius dushta - Chinese dart
Potanthus mara - branded Sikkim dart
Potanthus nesta nesta - Sikkim dart
Potanthus pava - Formosan dart
Potanthus palnia palnia - Palni dart
Telicota colon colon - pale palm dart
Telicota bambusae bambusae - dark palm dart
Telicota ohara jix - Plotz's palm dart
Cephrenes chrysozona oceanica - plain palm dart

Tribe Gegenini

Parnara guttata mangala - straight swift 
Parnara apostata debdasi - Sumatran swift
Parnara bada bada - Ceylon swift
Borbo cinnara cinnara - rice swift
Borbo bevani - Bevan's swift
Pelopidas sinensis - large branded swift
Pelopidas agna agna - little branded swift
Pelopidas mathias mathias - small branded swift
Pelopidas assamensis - great swift
Pelopidas conjuncta javana - conjoined swift
Polytremis lubricans lubricans - contiguous swift
Polytremis discreta discreta - Himalayan swift
Polytremis eltola eltola - yellow-spot swift
Baoris farri farri - paintbrush swift
Baoris penicillata unicolor - pencil swift
Baoris pagana - figure-of-eight swift
Caltoris sirius sirius - Sirius swift
Caltoris cahira austeni - colon swift
Caltoris kumara moorei - blank swift
Caltoris tulsi tulsi - purple swift
Caltoris plebeia - tufted swift

Family Papilionidae - swallowtails

Subfamily Parnassiinae
Parnassius epaphus epaphus - common red Apollo
Parnassius epaphus epaphus
Parnassius epaphus sikkimensis
Parnassius epaphus chiddii
Parnassius epaphus robertsi
Parnassius epaphus capdevillei
Parnassius epaphus boschmai
Parnassius hardwickii - common blue Apollo (endemic)
Parnassius stoliczkanus - Ladakh banded Apollo/many eyed Apollo
Parnassius stenosemus nobuko - Pir Panjal banded Apollo
Parnassius acdestis - banded Apollo
Parnassius acdestis katsuhikoi 
Parnassius acdestis laurentii 
Parnassius acdestis marki 
Parnassius acdestis whitei 
Parnassius cephalus horii - dusky Apollo
Parnassius simo - black-edged Apollo
Parnassius simo acconus
Parnassius simo simo
Parnassius acco acco - varnished Apollo

Subfamily Papilioninae

Tribe Leptocircini
Teinopalpus imperialis imperialis - Kaiser-i-Hind
Meandrusa gyas gyas - brown gorgon
Pathysa eurous sikkimica - six-bar swordtail
Pathysa glycerion - spectacle swordtail (endemic)
Pathysa antiphates pompilius - five-bar swordtail 
Pathysa nomius nomius - spot swordtail
Graphium cloanthus cloanthus - glassy bluebottle
Graphium sarpedon luctatius - common bluebottle
Graphium agamemnon agamemnon - tailed jay
Graphium doson axion - common jay
Graphium clanis chironicum - veined jay
Graphium xenocles phrontis - great zebra
Graphium macareus indicus - lesser zebra

Tribe Papilionini

Chilasa agestor - tawny mime 
Chilasa agestor agestor (endemic)
Chilasa agestor govindra (endemic)
Chilasa epycides epycides - lesser mime
Chilasa clytia clytia - common mime
Papilio machaon - common yellow swallowtail
Papilio machaon rinpoche
Papilio machaon emihippocrates
Papilio demoleus demoleus - lime swallowtail
Papilio paris decorosa - Paris peacock
Papilio polyctor ganesa - common peacock
Papilio arcturus arcturus - blue peacock
Papilio krishna - Krishna peacock
Papilio memnon agenor - great Mormon
Papilio polymnestor - blue Mormon
Papilio protenor euprotenor - spangle
Papilio alcmenor - common redbreast
Papilio janaka - tailed redbreast
Papilio polytes romolus - common Mormon
Papilio helenus helenus - red Helen
Papilio nephelus chaon - yellow Helen
Papilio castor polias - common raven

Tribe Troidini
Pachliopta aristolochiae aristolochiae - common rose
Atrophaneura latreillei latreillei - rose windmill (endemic)
Atrophaneura polyeuctes letincius - common windmill
Atrophaneura dasarada dasarada - great windmill
Atrophaneura dasarada ravana
Atrophaneura alcinous pembertoni - Chinese windmill
Atrophaneura aidoneus - lesser batwing
Atrophaneura varuna astorion - common batwing
Troides helena cerberus - common birdwing
Troides aeacus aeacus - golden birdwing

Family Pieridae - whites

Tribe Pierini

Metaporia agathon agathon - great blackvein
Metaporia agathon agathon (endemic)
Metaporia agathon caphusa (endemic)
Metaporia agathon phryxe (endemic)
Metaporia leucodice - Himalayan blackvein
Mesapia peloria - Tibetan blackvein
Baltia butleri butleri - Butler's dwarf
Pieris brassicae nepalensis - large cabbage white
Pieris canidia indica - Indian cabbage white
Pieris montanus - green-veined white
Synchloe callidice - lofty Bath white
Synchloe sherpae - Sherpa white (endemic)
Pontia daplidice moorei - Bath white
Belenois aurota aurota - pioneer
Cepora nadina - lesser gull
Cepora nerissa phryne - common gull
Delias belladonna - hill Jezebel
Delias belladonna horsfieldi
Delias belladonna lugens
Delias sanaca oreas - pale Jezebel
Delias berinda boyleae - dark Jezebel
Delias pasithoe thyra - red-base Jezebel
Delias acalis pyramus - read-breast Jezebel
Delias descombesi leucacantha - red-spot Jezebel
Delias agostina agostina - yellow Jezebel
Delias hyparete indica - painted Jezebel
Delias eucharis - common Jezebel
Appias libythea olferna - striped albatross
Appias lyncida eleonora - chocolate albatross
Appias albina darada - common albatross
Appias indra indra - plain puffin
Appias lalage lalage - spot puffin
Leptosia nina nina - Psyche
Prioneris thestylis thestylis - spotted sawtooth

Tribe Euchloeini

Ixias marianne - white orange tip
Ixias pyrene familiaris - yellow orange tip
Hebomoia glaucippe glaucippe - great orange tip
Pareronia valeria hippia - common wanderer
Pareronia avatar avatar - pale wanderer

Tribe Coliadini

Catopsilia pomona pomona - lemon emigrant or common emigrant
Catopsilia pyranthe pyranthe - mottled emigrant
Gonepteryx rhamni napalensis - common brimstone
Gonepteryx aspasia zaneka - lesser brimstone
Dercas verhuelli doubledayi - tailed sulpher
Gandaca harina assamica - tree yellow
Eurema andersonii jordani - one-spot grass yellow 
Eurema brigitta rubella - small grass yellow
Eurema laeta sikkima - spotless grass yellow
Eurema blanda silhetana - three-spot grass yellow
Eurema hecabe contubernalis - common grass yellow
Colias tibetana - Tibetan clouded yellow
Colias ladakensis - Ladakh clouded yellow
Colias berylla - Everest clouded yellow
Colias erate lativitta - pale clouded yellow
Colias stoliczkana - orange clouded yellow
Colias stoliczkana miranda
Colias stoliczkana cathleenae
Colias fieldii fieldii - dark clouded yellow

Family Lycaenidae - blues

Subfamily Poritiinae
Poritia hewitsoni hewitsoni - common gem

Subfamily Miletinae

Tribe Miletini
Miletus chinensis assamensis - common brownie
Allotinus drumila drumila - great darkie
Logania distanti massalia - dark mottle

Tribe Spalgini
Spalgis epeus epeus - apefly

Tribe Tarakini
Taraka hamada mendesia - forest Pierrot

Tribe Liphyrini
Liphyra brassolis brassolis - moth butterfly

Subfamily Curetinae
Curetis bulis bulis - bright sunbeam
Curetis acuta dentata - angled sunbeam

Subfamily Aphnaeinae
Cigaritis vulcanus vulcanus - common silverline
Cigaritis schistacea gabriel - plumbous silverline
Cigaritis elima uniformis - scarce shot silverline
Cigaritis nipalicus nipalicus - silver-grey silverline (endemic)
Cigaritis lohita himalayanus - long-banded silverline
Cigaritis syama peguanus - club silverline

Subfamily Theclinae

Tribe Theclini
Ahlbergia haradai - prickly ash elfin (endemic)  
Euaspa milionia - water hairstreak
Esakiozephyrus icana - dull green hairstreak
Esakiozephyrus mandara dohertyi - Indian purple hairstreak
Chrysozephyrus sikkimensis - Sikkim green hairstreak
Chrysozephyrus zoa - powdered green hairstreak
Chrysozephyrus duma - metallic green hairstreak
Chrysozephyrus disparatus interpositas - Sikkim hairstreak
Chrysozephyrus birupa - fawn hairstreak
Chrysozephyrus bhutanensis - Bhutan silver hairstreak
Chrysozephyrus syla - silver hairstreak
Chrysozephyrus assamicus - Assam silver hairstreak
Chrysozephyrus kirbariensis shakuhuge - Kirbari hairstreak
Chrysozephyrus paona - Paona hairstreak
Chrysozephyrus ataxus ataxus - wonderful hairstreak
Neozephyrus suroia yukie - caerulean hairstreak
Chaetoprocta odata - walnut blue
Chaetoprocta odata baileyi
Chaetoprocta odata kurumi

Tribe Arhopalini
Amblopala avidiena nepalica - Chinese hairstreak
Mahathala ameria ameria - falcate oakblue
Arhopala oenea - Hewitson's dull oakblue
Arhopala khamti - Doherty's dull oakblue
Arhopala atrax - Indian oakblue
Arhopala bazaloides - Tamil oakblue
Arhopala birmana birmana - Burmese bushblue
Arhopala amantes apella - large oakblue
Arhopala pseudocentaurus pirithous - centaur oakblue
Arhopala bazalus teesta - powdered oakblue
Arhopala singla - yellow-disc oakblue
Arhopala eumolphus - green oakblue
Arhopala paramuta paramuta - hooked oakblue
Arhopala rama rama - dark Himalayan oakblue
Arhopala dodonaea - pale Himalayan oakblue
Arhopala perimuta - yellow-disk tailless oakblue
Arhopala fulla ignara - spotless oakblue
Arhopala abseus indicus - aberrant oakblue
Panchala ganesa ganesa - tailless bushblue
Panchala paraganesa paraganesa - dusky bushblue
Flos fulgida fulgida - shining plushblue
Flos adriana - variegated plushblue
Flos asoka - spangled plushblue
Flos chinensis - Chinese plushblue
Flos areste - tailless plushblue
Surendra quercetorum quercetorum - common acacia blue
Zinaspa todara distorta - silver-streaked acacia blue

Tribe Zesiini
Zesius chrysomallus - redspot

Tribe Amblypodiini
Iraota timoleon timoleon - silverstreak blue

Tribe Catapaecilmatini
Catapaecilma major major - common tinsel

Tribe Horagini
Horaga onyx onyx - common onyx
Horaga albimacula viola - brown onyx

Tribe Loxurini
Loxura atymnus continentalis - yamfly

Tribe Cheritrini
Cheritra freja evansi - common imperial
Cheritrella truncipennis - truncate imperial
Ticherra acte acte - blue imperial

Tribe Iolaini
Tajuria yajna istroides - chestnut royal
Tajuria diaeus - straightline royal
Tajuria cippus cippus - peacock royal
Tajuria illurgis - white royal
Tajuria illurgoides - scarce white royal
Tajuria luculentus nela - Chinese royal
Tajuria maculata - spotted royal
Dacalana cotys - white banded royal
Pratapa deva lila - white tufted royal
Pratapa icetas icetas - dark blue royal
Creon cleobis cleobis - broadtail royal
Maneca bhotea - slate royal
Charana mandarinus mandarinus - mandarin blue
Rachana jalindra indra - banded royal
Neocheritra fabronia fabronia - pale grand imperial

Tribe Remelaini
Remelana jangala ravata - chocolate royal
Ancema ctesia ctesia - bispot royal
Ancema blanka minturna - silver royal

Tribe Hypolycaenini
Hypolycaena erylus himavantus - common tit
Zeltus amasa amasa - fluffy tit
Chliaria othona - orchid tit
Chliaria kina - blue tit

Tribe Deudorigini

Artipe eryx - green flash
Virachola isocrates - common guava blue
Virachola perse perse - large guava blue
Deudorix epijarbas ancus - cornelian
Rapala refulgens - refulgent flash
Rapala damona - Malay red flash
Rapala tara - Assam flash
Rapala varuna orseis - indigo flash
Rapala manea schistacea - slate flash
Rapala scintilla - scarce slate flash
Rapala pheretima petosiris - copper flash
Rapala dieneces dieneces - scarlet flash
Rapala iarbus - common red flash
Rapala rectivitta - shot flash
Rapala nissa nissa - common flash
Rapala micans selira - Himalayan red flash
Sinthusa nasaka pallidior - narrow spark
Sinthusa chandrana - broad spark
Pamela dudgeoni - Lister's hairstreak

Subfamily Lycaeninae
Lycaena pavana - white-bordered copper
Lycaena phlaeas baralacha - common copper
Heliophorus sena - sorrel sapphire
Heliophorus epicles latilimbata - purple sapphire
Heliophorus indicus - Indian purple sapphire
Heliophorus ila pseudonexus - restricted purple sapphire
Heliophorus moorei - azure sapphire 
Heliophorus bakeri - western blue sapphire
Heliophorus oda - eastern blue sapphire
Heliophorus brahma brahma - golden sapphire
Heliophorus androcles coruscans - green sapphire
Heliophorus tamu tamu - powdery green sapphire

Subfamily Polyommatinae

Tribe Lycaenesthini
Anthene emolus emolus - ciliate blue
Anthene lycaenina lycambes - pointed ciliate blue

Tribe Niphandini
Niphanda cymbia cymbia - pointed Pierrot

Tribe Polyommatini

 

Orthomiella pontis - straightwing blue
Orthomiella ronkayana - Nepal straight wing blue (endemic)
Petrelaea dana dana - dingy lineblue
Nacaduba pactolus continentalis - large fourline-blue
Nacaduba hermus nabo - Pale fourline-blue
Nacaduba kurava euplea - transparent sixline-blue
Ionolyce helicon merguiana - pointed lineblue
Prosotas nora ardates - common lineblue
Prosotas pia marginata - margined lineblue
Prosotas dubiosa indica - tailless lineblue
Prosotas lutes sivoka - banded lineblue
Prosotas bhutea - Bhutya lineblue
Jamides bochus bochus - dark cerulean
Jamides celeno aelianus - common cerulean
Jamides alecto alocina - metallic cerulean
Catochrysops strabo strabo - forget-me-not blue
Catochrysops panormus exiguus - silver forget-me-not blue
Lampides boeticus - peablue
Syntarucus plinius - zebra blue
Castalius rosimon rosimon - common Pierrot
Caleta caleta decidia - angled Pierrot
Caleta elna noliteia - elbowed Pierrot
Tarucus ananda ananda - dark Pierrot
Tarucus waterstradti dharta - Assam Pierrot
Tarucus callinara - spotted Pierrot
Tarucus nara alteratus - striped Pierrot
Zizeeria maha maha - pale grass blue
Zizeeria karsandra - dark grass blue
Zizina otis otis - lesser grass blue
Zizula hylax - tiny grass blue
Everes argiades diporides - Chapman's Cupid
Everes huegelii huegelii - tailed Cupid
Everes lacturnus assamica - Indian Cupid
Azanus uranus - dull babul blue
Pithecops corvus correctus - forest Quaker
Neopithecops zalmora zalmora - common Quaker
Megisba malaya sikkima - Malayan
Lestranicus transpectus - white-banded hedge-blue
Acytolepis puspa gisca - common hedge-blue
Celatoxia marginata marginata - margined hedge-blue (endemic)
Celastrina argiolus kollari - hill hedge-blue
Celastrina argiolus jynteana
Celastrina hersilia vipia - Naga hedge-blue
Celastrina gigas - silvery hedge-blue
Celastrina huegelii oreiodes - large hedge-blue
Celastrina lavendularis limbata - plain hedge-blue
Udara dilecta - pale hedge-blue (endemic)
Udara albocaerulea - albocaerulean
Oreolyce vardhana - dusky hedge-blue
Oreolyce vardhana vardhana
Oreolyce vardhana nepalica
Euchrysops cnejus - gram blue
Luthrodes pandava pandava - plains Cupid
Chilades parrhasius - small Cupid
Chilades lajus lajus - lime blue
Freyeria trochylus orientalis - grass jewel
Freyeria putli - least grass jewel
Polyommatus pierinoi - Manang meadow blue (endemic)
Polyommatus stoliczkana arene - common meadow blue
Polyommatus nepalensis - Nepal meadow blue (endemic)
Aricia astrarche - orange-bordered argus
Agriades luana - Tibetan argus
Albulina asiatica - azure mountain blue
Albulina lehana - common mountain blue
Albulina orbitulus lobbichleri - greenish mountain blue
Albulina galathea galathea - large green underwing

Family Riodinidae

Dodona durga - common Punch
Dodona dipoea - lesser Punch
Dodona eugenes eugenes - tailed Punch
Dodona egeon egeon - orange Punch
Dodona ouida - mixed Punch
Dodona adonira - striped Punch
Abisara bifasciata suffusa - plum Judy
Abisara fylla fylla - dark Judy
Abisara chela chela - spot Judy
Abisara neophron neophronoides - tailed Judy
Zemeros flegyas indicus - Punchinello

Family Nymphalidae - nymphalids

Subfamily Libytheinae
Libythea celtis lepita - common beak
Libythea myrrha sanguinalis - club beak (endemic)

Subfamily Heliconiinae

Acraea violae - tawny coster
Acraea issoria - yellow coster
Cethosia biblis tisamena - red lacewing
Cethosia cyane - leopard lacewing
Cupha erymanthis lotis - rustic
Vagrans egista - vagrant
Vindula erota erota - cruiser
Cirrochroa aoris aoris - large yeoman
Cirrochroa tyche mithila - common yeoman
Phalanta phalantha phalantha - common leopard
Argynnis hyperbius hyperbius - Indian fritillary
Argynnis childreni - large silverstripe
Argynnis childreni childreni (endemic)
Argynnis childreni sakontala (endemic)
Fabriciana kamala - common silverstripe
Fabriciana adippe jaindeva - highbrown silverspot
Speyeria clara - silverstreak
Speyeria clara clara
Speyeria clara shieldsi
Issoria lathonia - Queen of Spain fritillary (endemic)
Issoria annapurnae - Annapurna silverspot
Issoria mackinnonii - Mackinnon's silverspot
Issoria gemmata - gem silverspot

Subfamily Nymphalinae

Symbrenthia lilaea khasiana - common jester
Symbrenthia hypselis cotanda - spotted jester
Symbrenthia brabira sivokana - Himalayan jester
Symbrenthia niphanda niphanda - blue-tail jester
Vanessa cardui - painted lady
Vanessa indica - Indian red admiral
Aglais caschmirensis aesis - Indian tortoiseshell
Aglais ladakensis - Ladakh tortoiseshell
Nymphalis xanthomelas  fervescens - large tortoiseshell
Kaniska canace canace - blue admiral
Polygonia agnicula - Nepal comma (endemic)
Junonia hierta hierta - yellow pansy
Junonia orithya ocyale - blue pansy
Junonia lemonias - lemon pansy
Junonia almana almana - peacock pansy
Junonia atlites atlites - grey pansy
Junonia iphita - chocolate pansy
Hypolimnas misippus - Danaid eggfly
Hypolimnas bolina jacintha - great eggfly
Kallima inachus - orange oakleaf
Doleschallia bisaltide indica - autumn leaf
Melitaea arcesia sikkimensis - blackvein fritillary

Subfamily Biblidinae

Ariadne ariadne pallidor - angled castor
Ariadne merione - common castor

Subfamily Limenitidinae

Tribe Limenitidini

Limenitis trivena pallida - Indian white admiral
Limenitis procris procris - commander
Limenitis zulema - scarce white commodore
Limenitis dudu - white commodore
Limenitis daraxa daraxa - green commodore
Limenitis zayla - bicolour commodore
Limenitis danava - common commodore
Lebadea martha martha - knight
Neurosigma siva siva - panther
Abrota ganga ganga - sergeant major
Athyma perius - common sergeant
Athyma jina jina - Bhutan sergeant
Athyma asura asura - studded sergeant
Athyma ranga ranga - blackvein sergeant
Athyma opalina orientalis - Himalayan sergeant
Athyma selenophora selenophora - staff sergeant
Athyma zeroca zeroca - small staff sergeant
Athyma cama cama - orange staff sergeant
Athyma nefte inara - colour sergeant

Tribe Neptini
Pantoporia hordonia hordonia - common lascar
Pantoporia sandaka davidsoni - extra lascar 
Lasippa viraja viraja - yellowjack sailer
Neptis clinia susrata - sullied sailer
Neptis sappho astola - Pallas' sailer
Neptis hylas kamarupa - common sailer
Neptis soma butleri - creamy sailer
Neptis nata - clear sailer
Neptis nata adipala
Neptis nata yerburii
Neptis mahendra mahendra - Himalayan sailer
Neptis pseudovikasi - dingy sailer
Neptis miah miah - small yellow sailer
Neptis sankara - broad-banded sailer
Neptis sankara sankara
Neptis sankara amba
Neptis cartica cartica - plain sailer (endemic)
Neptis magadha khasiana - spotted sailer
Neptis ananta ochracea - yellow sailer
Neptis zaida bhutanica - pale green sailer
Neptis armandia melba - variegated sailer
Neptis radha radha - great yellow sailer
Neptis narayana nana - broadstick sailer
Neptis manasa manasa - pale hockeystick sailer
Neptis nycteus - hockeystick sailer
Phaedyma aspasia kathmandia - great hockeystick sailer
Phaedyma columella ophiana - short-banded sailer

Tribe Euthaliini

Tanaecia julii appiades - common earl
Tanaecia lepidea lepidea - grey count
Euthalia aconthea suddhodana - common baron
Euthalia monina arhat - powdered baron
Euthalia telchinia - blue baron
Euthalia phemius - white-bordered blue baron
Euthalia lubentina indica - gaudy baron
Euthalia franciae franciae - French duke (endemic)
Euthalia durga durga - blue duke
Euthalia duda - blue duchess
Euthalia nara nara - bronze duke
Euthalia sahadeva sahadeva - green duke
Euthalia patala patala - grand duchess
Symphedra nais - baronet

Subfamily Cyrestinae
Pseudergolis wedah - tabby
Dichorragia nesimachus - constable
Stibochiona nicea - popinjay (endemic)
Cyrestis thyodamas - common map
Chersonesia risa - common maplet

Subfamily Apaturinae
Apatura ambica - Indian purple emperor
Apatura ambica ambica
Apatura ambica chitralensis
Apatura chevana - sergeant emperor
Rohana parisatis parisatis - black prince
Dilipa morgiana - golden emperor
Hestina nama nama - Circe
Diagora persimilis persimilis - common Siren
Diagora nicevillei - scarce Siren
Euripus consimilis - painted courtesan
Herona marathus marathus - pasha
Sephisa dichroa - western courtier
Sephisa chandra chandra - eastern courtier

Subfamily Charaxinae
Charaxes bernardus imna - tawny raja
Charaxes bernardus hemana
Charaxes bernardus hierax
Charaxes aristogiton - scarce tawny raja
Charaxes marmax - yellow raja
Charaxes kahruba - variegated raja
Charaxes solon - black raja
Polyura athamas - common nawab
Polyura agrarius - Swinhoe's nawab
Polyura arja - pallid nawab
Polyura dolon centralis - stately nawab
Polyura eudamippus eudamippus - great nawab

Subfamily Morphinae
Enispe euthymius tesallata - red caliph
Discophora sondaica zal - common duffer
Thaumantis diores diores - jungle-glory
Stichophthalma camadeva camadeva - northern jungle-queen

Subfamily Satyrinae

Tribe Melanitini

Melanitis leda ismene - common evening brown
Melanitis phedima bela - dark evening brown
Melanitis zitenius zitenius - great evening brown

Tribe Lethini
Lethe baladeva baladeva - treble silverstripe
Lethe europa niladana - bamboo treebrown
Lethe rohria rohria - common treebrown
Lethe confusa confusa - banded treebrown
Lethe insana dinarbus - common forester
Lethe serbonis teesta - brown forester
Lethe vindhya - black forester
Lethe kansa - bamboo forester
Lethe sinorix - red-tail forester
Lethe latiaris hige - pale forester
Lethe verma sintica - straight-banded treebrown
Lethe siderea - scarce woodbrown
Lethe sidonis sidonis - common woodbrown
Lethe dakwania - Garhwal woodbrown
Lethe nicetella - small woodbrown
Lethe nicetas - yellow woodbrown
Lethe maitrya maitrya - barred woodbrown
Lethe tristigmata - spotted mystic
Lethe jalaurida jalaurida - small silverfork
Lethe jalaurida elwesi
Lethe atkinsonia - small goldenfork
Lethe goalpara goalpara - large goldenfork
Lethe sura - lilacfork
Lethe dura gammiei - scarce lilacfork
Nemetis mekara mekara - straight red forester
Nemetis chandica - angled red forester
Lethe distans - scarce red forester
Neope pulaha pulaha - veined labyrinth
Neope pulahoides tamur - Tamur labyrinth
Neope pulahina - scarce labyrinth
Neope bhadra bhadra - tailed labyrinth
Patala yama yama - dusky labyrinth
Patala yama buckleyi
Lasiommata menava menava - dark wall brown
Lasiommata schakra - common wall brown
Rhaphicera moorei - small tawny wall
Rhaphicera satricus satricus - large tawny wall
Crebeta lehmanni - Nepal woodland brown
Orinoma damaris - tigerbrown

Tribe Elymniini
Elymnias hypermnestra undularis - common palmfly
Elymnias nesaea - tiger palmfly
Elymnias malelas malelas - spotted palmfly
Elymnias patna patna - blue-streaked palmfly
Elymnias vasudeva vasudeva - Jezebel palmfly

Tribe Mycalesini

Mycalesis anaxias aemate - white-bar bushbrown
Mycalesis adamsonii - double-branded bushbrown
Mycalesis francisca sanatana - lilacine bushbrown
Mycalesis perseus blasius - common bushbrown
Mycalesis mineus mineus - dark-brand bushbrown
Mycalesis visala visala - long-brand bushbrown
Mycalesis suaveolens tytleri - Wood-Mason's bushbrown
Mycalesis heri - Moore's bushbrown
Mycalesis nicotia - bright-eye bushbrown
Mycalesis malsara - white-line bushbrown
Mycalesis mamerta - blind-eye bushbrown
Mycalesis lepcha - Lepcha bushbrown
Orsotriaena medus medus - jungle brown

Tribe Ypthimini
Ypthima sakra - Himalayan fivering
Ypthima hannyngtoni khumbuensis - Hannyngton's fivering
Ypthima parasakra - Himalayan fourring
Ypthima baldus - common fivering
Ypthima indecora - western fivering
Ypthima avanta avanta - jewel fourring
Ypthima singala - small jewel fourring
Ypthima huebneri - common fourring
Ypthima kasmira - Kashmir fourring
Ypthima nareda - large threering
Ypthima asterope mahratta - common threering
Ypthima inica - lesser threering
Ypthima newara - Newar threering
Ypthima confusa - confusing threering
Dallacha hyagriva hyagriva - brown argus
Dallacha hyagriva nepalica
Dallacha narasingha narasingha - mottled argus
Callerebia annada caeca - ringed argus
Callerebia hybrida - hybrid argus
Callerebia scanda opima - pallid argus
Callerebia nirmala nirmala - common argus
Paralasa nepalica - Nepal argus

Tribe Coenonymphini
Coenonympha amaryllis forsteri -  heath

Tribe Maniolini
Hyponephele lupinus cheerna - branded meadow brown

Tribe Satyrini
Aulocera brahminus dokwana - narrow-banded satyr
Aulocera padma padma - great satyr
Aulocera loha - Doherty's satyr
Aulocera swaha - common satyr
Aulocera swaha gauena
Aulocera saraswati - striated satyr
Hipparchia parisatis - mountain satyr
Paroeneis pumilus grandis - mountain satyr
Paroeneis sikkimensis - Sikkim mountain satyr

Subfamily Danainae

Tribe Danaini

Danaus chrysippus chrysippus - plain tiger
Danaus genutia - common tiger
Danaus genutia nipalensis
Tirumala limniace exoticus - blue tiger
Tirumala septentrionis - dark blue tiger (endemic)
Parantica aglea melanoides - glassy tiger
Parantica melaneus plataniston - chocolate tiger
Parantica sita sita - chestnut tiger (endemic)
Parantica pedonga - Talbot's chestnut tiger (endemic)
Euploea midamus rogenhoferi - blue-spotted crow
Euploea diocletianus ramsayi - magpie crow
Euploea klugii klugii - blue king crow
Euploea klugii kollari - brown king crow
Euploea mulciber mulciber - striped blue crow
Euploea sylvester hopei - double-branded blue crow
Euploea core core - common Indian crow
Euploea algea deione - long-branded blue crow

See also
List of moths of Nepal (Bombycidae)
List of moths of Nepal (Brahmaeidae)
List of moths of Nepal (Drepanidae)
List of moths of Nepal (Eupterotidae)
List of moths of Nepal (Lasiocampidae)
List of moths of Nepal (Limacodidae)
List of moths of Nepal (Saturniidae)
List of moths of Nepal (Sphingidae)
List of moths of Nepal (Uraniidae)
List of moths of Nepal (Zygaenidae)
List of beetles of Nepal (Cerambycidae)
List of beetles of Nepal (Coccinellidae)
List of bugs of Nepal (Scutelleridae)
List of Odonata of Nepal
Wildlife of Nepal

References

Further reading

 01
N
Butter
Nepal
Insects of Nepal
Nepal